The Crimson Gold is a fantasy novel by Voronica Whitney-Robinson, set in the Forgotten Realms fictional universe. It is the third novel in "The Rogues" series.

Plot summary
This novel is set in Thay. A rogue wanted out, wanted a new life and a trophy worthy of a master thief - the source of the treasured crimson gold. She wanted to face an undead emperor on his home ground and live to tell the tale.

Publication history
2003, USA, Wizards of the Coast , Pub date 1 December 2003, Paperback.

Reception
One reviewer stated "Overall, The Crimson Gold by Voronica Whitney-Robinson is a nice addition to the Forgotten Realms world of books." Another reviewer felt that Tazi was the best part of the book.

References

2003 American novels
American fantasy novels
Forgotten Realms novels